The Bacon County School District is a public school district in Bacon County, Georgia, United States, based in Alma. It serves the communities of Alma and Rockingham.

Schools
The Bacon County School District has one primary school, one elementary school, one middle school, and one high school. The district has 126 full-time teachers and over 1,900 students.

Elementary schools
 Bacon County Primary School (pre-school - grade 2)
 Bacon County Elementary School (grades 3 - 5)

Middle school
 Bacon County Middle School

High school
 Bacon County High School

References

External links
 

School districts in Georgia (U.S. state)
Education in Bacon County, Georgia